Amanda Somerville (born March 7, 1979) is an American singer-songwriter and vocal coach who resides in Wolfsburg, Germany. She is known primarily for her work with many European symphonic metal bands.

Biography

Personal life 
Somerville was raised in Flushing, Michigan. She attended Flushing Senior High School,  original graduating class of 1997, however graduating a full year early in 1996 and winning a scholarship for graduating with high honors to the University of Michigan–Flint, where she majored in psychology. Somerville moved to Wolfsburg, Germany in 1999, where she resided for several years, working mainly in Germany and the Netherlands.

On August 19, 2013, she announced that she was engaged to be married to After Forever's former guitarist Sander Gommans, and the pair were married on July 26, 2014. On January 8, 2015, she announced that she and Gommans were expecting their first child. On July 17, 2015, their daughter, Lana Elise Gommans, was born. In 2018, their identical twin daughters Anya and Juliet were born.

Music career 
Somerville has written and recorded with bands such as After Forever, Edguy, Kamelot, Epica, Avantasia, and Docker's Guild, and has produced two solo albums.  Her solo releases to date are primarily soft and elegant pop rock with some hard rock, folk and soul music influences. Somerville herself wrote and contributed instrumentally to all of the songs on her solo albums, with only one exception, "Out" from the album Windows (written by Sascha Paeth).

She collaborated with several of these metal bands alongside producers Sascha Paeth and Michael Rodenberg, which led her to collaborate with multi-instrumentalist Robert Hunecke-Rizzo, co-writing the rock opera Aina. Later she made a similar collaboration with guitarist Sander Gommans (After Forever), providing vocals and lyrical concept for the project HDK.  In 2008, she toured America with Dutch heavy metal band Epica, while regular vocalist Simone Simons recovered from a staph infection.

Kiske/Somerville 

In 2010, she collaborated with Michael Kiske (Helloween singer) on a musical project entitled Kiske/Somerville. The band is a melodic metal act put together by Frontiers Records, a similar project as Allen/Lande. Songwriting and producing was done by Primal Fear bassist Mat Sinner with collaboration by guitarist Magnus Karlsson (Allen/Lande, also from Primal Fear), Sander Gommans, Jimmy Kresic and Somerville herself. Their first single, "Silence", was released on August 20. Their self-titled album was released on 24 September 2010 by Frontiers Records, after the single accompanied by a music video for "Silence". A music video was also made for the song "If I Had One Wish." Somerville contributed creatively to the album by writing three of its songs: "A Thousand Suns," "Arise" and "Set Afire," all co-written with Sander Gommans.

Avantasia 

Somerville was also one of the live guest vocalists for Tobias Sammet's metal opera Avantasia world tours in 2008, 2010, 2013 and 2016. Her role onstage included singing backing vocals during the whole setlist and performing lead vocals for the songs "Farewell," "The Wicked Symphony," "Lost in Space" and "Sign of the Cross." She parted ways with Avantasia in 2019, citing personal reasons.

Trillium 

In 2011, Somerville finally released her first heavy metal-oriented project, called Trillium, the album entitled Alloy, with the record company Frontiers Records. The project has contributions by Sascha Paeth, Michael Rodenberg, Sander Gommans and a guest appearance of Jørn Lande on a duet vocal track with Somerville.

Trillium live band members 

Amanda Somerville - vocals (2011–present)
Paul Owsinski - guitar (2011–present)
Marc Burnash - bass, vocals (2011–present)
Simon Oberender (†) - keyboard (2011-2012)
Philip Krause - drums (2011-2012)
Tom Pluijmaekers - drums (2013)

In 2018, the name of the project was updated to "Amanda Somerville's Trillium" and the 2nd album was released, entitled Tectonic. A video was filmed and released for the song "Time To Shine" and lyric videos were released for the tracks "Shards" and "Full Speed Ahead."

Docker's Guild 
Somerville was featured on Douglas R. Docker's space metal opera Docker's Guild. In 2012, she appeared on the song "Black Swan", a duet with Göran Edman on the debut album The Mystic Technocracy - Season 1: The Age of Ignorance. In 2016, she was featured again in the "Flash Gordon Suite", from Queen's soundtrack of the same name, on the album The Heisenberg Diaries - Book A: Sounds of Future past.

New HDK, Kiske/Somerville albums and beyond 

In 2014, a new HDK album called Serenades of the Netherworld was released, featuring Somerville and Geert Kroes on vocals, and once again produced and composed by Sander Gommans. This was also the year Somerville and Gommans were married. Somerville was also part of a metal opera project from the Middle East, produced by Lebanese guitarist Amadeus Awad, with an album called The Book of Gates. She played the part of the Queen of the Nile.

In 2015, the second Kiske/Somerville album, entitled City of Heroes, was announced and released, once again featuring bassist Mat Sinner as producer and in a songwriting partnership with guitarist Magnus Karlsson, who was also in charge of the keyboards, while Veronika Lukesova was the drummer. The song "Breaking Neptune" was written by Somerville and Gommans, and two music videos were filmed for the songs "City of Heroes" and "Walk on Water".

Exit Eden 

In 2017, another new project was announced. Called Exit Eden, it features Somerville and three other female singers from the rock/metal scene: Clémentine Delauney (Visions of Atlantis, Serenity, Melted Space, Kai Hansen & Friends), Marina La Torraca (who replaced Somerville in a few festival shows of the Avantasia 2016 world tour) and newcomer Anna Brunner. The band was conceived with the plan "to show the world that almost every classic song can be transformed into a solid Metal-Rock song", a concept similar to Finland's Northern Kings. The tracklist of their debut album, Rhapsodies In Black, features some pop hits such as Madonna's "Frozen", Adele's "Skyfall" and Lady Gaga's "Paparazzi". The album was released on August 4, 2017 via Napalm Records worldwide and via Starwatch in Germany, Switzerland and Austria. Simone Simons (Epica) appears on two tracks of the album.

Discography

Solo 

In the Beginning There Was... (2000)
Blue Nothing (EP, 2000)
Never Alone (EP, 2003)
Windows (2008)
Conformity Challenged (TBA)

Aina 

Days of Rising Doom (2003)

HDK 

System Overload (2008)
Serenades of the Netherworld (2014)

Kiske/Somerville 

Kiske/Somerville (2010)
City of Heroes (2015)

Trillium 

Alloy (2011)
Tectonic (2018)

Exit Eden 

Rhapsodies in Black (2017)

Collaborations 

Somerville's contributions include vocals, coaching, production, engineering and choir conductor:

Featured vocals

Coaching, production, engineering and choir conductor 

Aeverium – The Harvest EP (2014), Break Out (2015), Time (2017); vocal coach, producer, backing vocals, guest vocals
After Forever – Invisible Circles (2004), Remagine (2005), After Forever (2007); vocal coach, backing/choir vocals, producer
Andre Matos – Time to Be Free (2007), Mentalize (2009); choir/backing vocals and lyrical editor
Asrai – Touch in the Dark (2004): lyrical editor
Ebony Ark – Decoder 2.0 (2007); backing vocals, vocal coach
Edguy – Hellfire Club (2004), Rocket Ride (2006); backing vocals, lyrical editor
Epica – The Phantom Agony (2003), We Will Take You with Us (2004), Consign to Oblivion (2005), The Road to Paradiso (2006), The Divine Conspiracy (2007), live session singer for USA Canada tour (2008), Design Your Universe (2009); vocal coach, backing/choir vocals, co-writer, producer, Requiem for the Indifferent (2012)
Kambrium - Dark Reveries (2013); vocalist on the song "Lake Gloom"
Kamelot – The Black Halo (2005), Ghost Opera (2007), Poetry For The Poisoned (2010), Silverthorn (2012); choir / backing vocals and story author based on Silverthorn's concept
Luca Turilli – Prophet of the Last Eclipse (2002); choir vocals
Mob Rules – Ethnolution A.D. (2002); choir vocals
Shaman – Ritual (2002), Reason (2005); backing vocals, lyrical editor
Virgo – Virgo (2001); vocalist, lyrical editor
Xandria - Sacrificium (2014); spoken words on the song "Betrayer"

References

Notes

External links 

 

1979 births
Living people
American singer-songwriters
American rock songwriters
American women singer-songwriters
American women heavy metal singers
American expatriates in Germany
American vocal coaches
University of Michigan–Flint alumni
21st-century American singers
21st-century American women singers